Maribel Martín de la Iglesia (born 26 May 1971) is a Spanish ski mountaineer. Together with Gemma Arró Ribot and Izaskun Zubizarreta Guerendiain she placed sixth in the relay event of the 2007 European Championship of Ski Mountaineering.

References 

1971 births
Living people
Spanish female ski mountaineers
21st-century Spanish women